Rosita Díaz Gimeno (September 13, 1908 – August 23, 1986) was a Spanish stage and film actress from Madrid.

Stage actress

Díaz Gimeno was educated at the Convent of the Sacred Heart in Madrid. She trained in theater at the conservatory of the Teatro Real. She appeared in thirty-five plays in Spain, beginning her career
accompanied by G. Martinez Sierra, a Spanish playwright. Díaz Gimeno achieved fame as a stage actress in Spain and France.

American films

Acquired by the Fox Film Company, Diaz Gimeno came to Hollywood in October 1934. She signed her contract in Paris, France. She made Rosa de Francia in 1935. The movie set a record in film by requiring Diaz Gimeno to sit in a tub filled with soap suds for nine hours, while shots were made. The same year she filmed Angelina o el honor de un brigadier. This production was immensely popular with audiences in Harlem, New York.

Government informant

Diaz Gimeno was reported to have been executed as a spy by Spanish Insurgents in January 1937. She had been arrested at Córdoba, during the Spanish Civil War, in August 1936.  She was released. Later she went to Seville, the southern headquarters of the insurgents. There she mixed in military circles. Gimeno was found to have been affiliated with a secret broadcast station which supplied the Spanish government with information regarding insurgent military plans.

Film actress Rosita Moreno received a cablegram on February 27, 1937. In answer to one she had sent to Segovia, the reply read: I am well. Fondest greetings. It was signed Rosita. Spanish police also denied that Gimeno had been shot or arrested. However they professed ignorance as to her whereabouts. She was located in Segovia and contracted to appear in films, returning to Hollywood on May 24, 1937.

Late career

In 1948 Diaz Gimeno was forced to pay taxes to five governments-Morocco, Spain, France, the United States, and Mexico. At the time she was called Rosita Diaz Negrin. She was the wife of Dr. Juan Negrin Jr., son of former premier Juan Negrín of Loyalist Spain. Negrin was a New York brain surgeon. The couple became American citizens in 1953.

Diaz Gimeno starred in a Spanish production of The Teahouse of the August Moon, translated by Mexico's foremost playwright and close friend of the Negrin couple, Rodolfo Usigli in Mexico City, Mexico, in 1955. It was produced by Jean Dalrymple and Rita Allen of New York City. Rosita Díaz Gimeno played the part of Sakini, the cunning interpreter from Okinawa.

Rosita Diaz Gimeno died in 1986 in New York.

Selected filmography

References

Dunkirk-Fredonia Evening Observer, In Hollywood, Saturday, April 3, 1948, Page 6.
Long Beach Independent, Theater Department, September 7, 1955, Page 10.
Los Angeles Times, Hollywood Welcomes Miss Diaz, October 20, 1934, Page A3.
New York Times, Rosita Diaz Killed In Spain A Month Ago, February 27, 1937, Page 6.
New York Times, Film Star Not Executed, February 28, 1937, Page 27.
New York Times, Teahouse In Spanish, June 10, 1955, Page 17.
Syracuse Post-Standard, Lyons Den, Saturday, March 14, 1953, Page 7.
Washington Post, Broadway Glossary, December 6, 1946, Page 5.

External links

1908 births
1986 deaths
Spanish emigrants to the United States
Spanish stage actresses
Spanish film actresses
20th-century Spanish actresses